The Mena is a river of eastern Ethiopia. It is located in the Delo Menna woreda in Bale Zone, Oromia Region. Its source lies in the Bale Mountains. It is a tributary of the Ganale Dorya.

Rivers of Ethiopia